Joseph Jerold Verducci (November 11, 1910 – November 6, 1964) was an American football player, coach, and college athletics administrator. He served as the head football coach at Saint Mary's College of California from 1948 to 1949 and at San Francisco State University from 1950 to 1960; he was also the athletic director at San Francisco State. Verducci was also a member of Daly City's city council and served as its mayor. One of his fellow councilmen was National Football League player Bob St. Clair, whom he coached at San Francisco Polytechnic High School.

He died in November 1964.

Head coaching record

College

References

External links
 

1910 births
1964 deaths
American football quarterbacks
Alameda Coast Guard Sea Lions football coaches
California Golden Bears football players
Saint Mary's Gaels football coaches
San Francisco State Gators athletic directors
San Francisco State Gators football coaches
High school football coaches in California